The Rt Rev William Lennox Mills was Bishop of Ontario from 1901 until 1917.

Born in Woodstock, Ontario and educated at Huron College, he was ordained in 1873. His first post was at Trinity Church, Norwich, Ontario after which he was Rector of St Thomas Seaforth, Ontario. From there he became Lecturer in Ecclesiastical History at the Montreal Diocesan Theological College, a  canon of Christ Church Cathedral, Montreal and finally (before his elevation to the episcopate) Archdeacon of St Andrew's, also in the Diocese of Montreal.

Notes

External links 
 Biography at the Dictionary of Canadian Biography Online

1846 births
University of Western Ontario alumni
Canadian Anglican priests
Archdeacons of St Andrews, PQ
Anglican bishops of Ontario
Canadian bishops
1917 deaths
People from Woodstock, Ontario